Maňa is a village and municipality in the Nové Zámky District in the Nitra Region of south-west Slovakia.

History
In historical records the village was first mentioned in 1237.

Geography
The village lies at an altitude of 133 metres and covers an area of 21.594 km². It has a population of about 2075 people.

Demographics
The population is about 98% Slovak.

Facilities
The village has a public library and a gym.

External links
https://web.archive.org/web/20070513023228/http://www.statistics.sk/mosmis/eng/run.html
Maňa – Nové Zámky Okolie

Villages and municipalities in Nové Zámky District